The Apostolic Vicariate of Derna is a Latin Church missionary territory or apostolic vicariate of the Catholic Church in Derna, Libya. It has an episcopal see, but no cathedral.

The apostolic vicariate is exempt to the Holy See, specifically the Congregation for the Evangelization of Peoples) and not part of any ecclesiastical province.

History 
 Established on June 22, 1939 as Apostolic Vicariate of Derna, on territory split from the Apostolic Vicariate of Cyrenaica.

Episcopal ordinaries

 Apostolics Vicar of Derna
 Giovanni Lucato, Salesians (S.D.B.) (September 13, 1939 – June 21, 1948), Titular Bishop of Tigias, later Bishop of Isernia and Venafro (Italy (1948.06.21 – 1962.05.01)
 Apostolic Administrator Giustino Giulio Pastorino, Friars Minor (O.F.M.) (no dates provided), Titular Bishop of Babra, Apostolic Vicar of Benghazi (1965–1997)

See also
Apostolic Prefecture of Misurata

Source, References and External links 
 GCatholic.org, with incumbent biography links
 Catholic Hierarchy

Roman Catholic dioceses in Libya
Christian organizations established in 1939
Apostolic vicariates
Roman Catholic dioceses and prelatures established in the 20th century
1939 establishments in Libya